Andabil (also Romanized as Andabīl; also known as Andehbīl and Yandabil’) is a village in Chelleh Khaneh Rural District, Sufian District, Shabestar County, East Azerbaijan Province, Iran. At the 2006 census, its population was 739, in 206 families.

References 

Populated places in Shabestar County